Romance of the Three Kingdoms is a Chinese television series adapted from the classical 14th century novel of the same title by Luo Guanzhong. The series was produced by China Central Television (CCTV) and was first aired on the network in 1994. It spanned a total of 84 episodes, each approximately 45 minutes long. One of the most expensive television series produced at the time, the project was completed over four years and involved over 400,000 cast and crew members, including divisions of the People's Liberation Army from the Beijing, Nanjing and Chengdu military regions. Some of the dialogues spoken by characters were adapted directly from the novel. Extensive battle scenes, such as the battles of Guandu, Red Cliffs and Xiaoting, were also live-acted.

The series is widely seen as among the best period dramas in China and appraised for capturing the grand scale of the novel's story, themes and characters while maintaining its artistic and historical value.
 The show has a 9.5 rating on Douban from over 89,030 reviews.

List of episodes
The series is divided into five parts and each part has a different executive producer and director(s).

Part One
 Title: 第一部：群雄逐鹿 (Part One: Heroes compete for power)
 Executive producer: You Shijun
 Director(s): Shen Haofang, Cai Xiaoqing

Part Two
 Title: 第二部：赤壁鏖战 (Part Two: The Battle of Red Cliffs)
 Executive producer: Zhang Guangqian
 Director: Cai Xiaoqing, Zhang Zhongyi

Part Three
 Title: 第三部：三国鼎立 (Part Three: Emergence of the Three Kingdoms)
 Executive producer: Shan Yusheng
 Director: Sun Guangming, Zhang Zhongyi

Part Four
 Title: 第四部：南征北战 (Part Four: Battles in the south and north)
 Executive producer: Zhang Jizhong
 Director: Zhang Shaolin

Part Five
 Title: 第五部：三分归一 (Part Five: Three united as one)
 Executive producer: Hao Hengmin
 Director: Zhang Zhongyi

Cast
Due to the time taken to complete the project (four years), there were numerous instances of (1) multiple actors playing the same character or (2) the same actor taking on multiple roles. An example of case (1) is the character Zhang Liao, who is portrayed by Xu Shaohua in episode 12, Zhang Yakun in episode 39, and Wang Weiguo in episode 54. Chen Zhihui is an extreme example of case (2) because he played a total of four roles – three as generals from Wei, Shu and Wu (Xu Chu, Liao Hua and Taishi Ci) and one as minor warlord Bao Xin. Two other prominent examples of case (2) were Wu Xiaodong and Hong Yuzhou – Wu portrayed Sun Jian in episode 5 and Sun Quan from episode 30 onwards; Hong played a young Yuan Shao in episode 5 and Zhou Yu from episode 9 onwards.

Main cast

 Sun Yanjun as Liu Bei
 Tang Guoqiang as Zhuge Liang
 Bao Guo'an as Cao Cao
 Lu Shuming as Guan Yu
 Li Jingfei as Zhang Fei
 Wu Xiaodong as Sun Quan / Sun Jian
 Hong Yuzhou as Zhou Yu / Yuan Shao (younger)

Other cast
Sorted by role in alphabetical order

 Du Wenlu as Ahuinan
 Xue Wencheng as Bao Long
 Chen Zhihui as Bao Xin
 Liu Shaochun as Bao Zhong
 Li Fengying as Lady Bian
 Liu Xiaomei as Lady Cai (Liu Biao's wife)
 Li Hua as Cai He
 Me Yue as Cai Mao
 Qin Zhao as Cai Yong
 Li Xiaozhou as Cai Zhong
 An Zhiyi as Cao Fang
 Huoercha / Bala Zhu'er / Wang Jie as Cao Hong
 Wang Han as Cao Huan
 Li Ming as Cao Jie
 Ji Chenmu as Cao Mao
 Yang Junyong as Cao Pi
 Tai Zuhui / Xu Deshan as Cao Ren
 Wang Guanghui as Cao Rui
 Kang Ming as Cao Shuang
 Chi Chonggen as Cao Xi
 Sun Zhencai as Cao Xun
 Zheng Qiang as Cao Zhen
 Wang Liangbo as Cao Zhi
 Wang Changli as Chen Deng
 Li Jianyi as Chen Gong (younger)
 Xiu Zongdi as Chen Gong (older)
 Niu Chaliang as Chen Gui
 Wang Tao as Chen Lin
 Chen Debao / Zhang Shijun as Chen Shi
 Zhang Shijun as Chen Qun
 Liu Yinglu as Chen Tai
 Dong Jiuru as Cheng Bing
 Zhang Ping as Cheng Ji
 Yan Huaili / Chen Zhuanliang as Cheng Pu
 Dai Jingguo / Yu Lianzeng as Cheng Yu
 Ren Meng as Cheng Zi
 Zhou Wanhong as Chunyu Qiong
 Zhuang Li as Lady Cui
 Li Songqiao as Cui Liang
 Zhao Xiaochuan as Cui Zhouping
 Wang Hongguang as Deng Ai
 Li Zhiyi as Deng Zhi
 Wu Wenqing as Deng Zhong
 Zhang Jiatian as Dian Wei
 Chen Hong as Diaochan
 Liu Shaochun / Wang Yi / Yang Baohe as Ding Feng
 Rui Lirong as Ding Yuan
 Lü Zhong as Empress Dowager Dong
 Liu Long as Dong Cheng
 Qin Baolin as Dongtuna
 Li Po as Dong Zhuo
 Wei Yingming as Duan Gui
 Liu He as King Duosi
 Zhang Xuting as Eheshaoge
 Shi Laiqun / Zhang Minfu as Fa Zheng
 Wei Deshan as Fan Qiang
 Qi Wenqiang as Fei Yao
 Li Hong as Fei Yi
 Yi Shufen / Guo Shuping as Lady Gan
 Han Dong / Zhang Yuhai as Gan Ning
 Yuan Lijian as Gao Xiang
 Yang Fan as Gongsun Zan
 Li Yanping as Gu Yong
 Ding Zhiyong as Guan Ping (younger)
 Chen Bing as Guan Ping (older)
 Li Wei as Guan Xing
 Chang Yuping / Sun Qicheng as Guo Huai
 Jiang Kai as Guo Jia
 Guo Shouyang as Guo Tu
 Zhu Jun as Han Dang
 Yu Rongguang as Han Fu
 Yang Zibin as Han Hao
 Sude Siqin as Han Meng
 Huang Xiaoli as Han Xuan
 Li Shicai as Hao Zhao
 Zheng Tianwei as Empress He
 Zhang Fuyuan as He Jin
 Ye Jinsen as Hu Ban
 Jiang Chongxia as Hu Lie
 Qi Jianbo as Hu Yuan
 Yu Weijie as Huche'er
 Wang Zhongxin as Hua Tuo
 Song Ge as Hua Xin
 Wen Hao as Huan Fan
 Wang Hongwu as Huang Chengyan
 Wu Guicen / Xu Fuyin as Huang Gai
 Zeng Ge as Huang Hao
 Wang Hongtao as Huang Zhong
 Qiao Chen as Huang Zhong's wife
 Wang Hongtao as Ji Ling
 Ding Zhicheng as Ji Ping
 Han Xinmin as Jia Chong
 Xu Yongliang / Li Xuliang as Jia Xu
 Su Jianyu as Jian Shuo
 An Ji as Jian Yong
 Zhou Zhou as Jiang Gan
 Liu Xi as Jiang Ji
 Liu Hongkun as Jiang Wan
 Zhang Tianshu as Jiang Wei (younger)
 Fan Zhiqi as Jiang Wei (older)
 Zhang Dengqiao as Jiang Wei's mother
 Wang Zhiqiang as Ju Shou
 Zhang Xiqian as Kan Ze
 Zheng Rong as Kong Rong
 Ma Jichun as Kuai Yue
 Zhang Yingwu / Sang Bao / Zhang Jinghai as Li Dian
 Wang Qiang / Zhang Jimin as Li Feng (Li Yan's son)
 Li Bao'an as Li Fu
 Wang Zhiqiang as Li Hui
 Bi Yanjun as Li Ru
 Yang Aifu as Li Sheng
 Yan Yansheng as Li Su
 Mang Lai / Chen Zhihui / Du Wenlu as Liao Hua
 Wang Gang / Han Zengxiang as Ling Tong
 Ma Zijun as Liu Bei's wedding emcee
 Zhu Feng as Liu Bian, Emperor Shao of Han
 Zhang Da as Liu Biao
 Chen Xu as Liu Chen
 Liang Chi as Liu Cong
 Huo Ercha as Liu Dai
 Zhao Zhenping as Liu Feng
 Liu Zongren as Liu Gui
 Yin Li as Liu Qi
 Li Tie as Liu Shan (younger)
 Lu Jixian as Liu Shan (older)
 Bao Dazhi as Liu Xie, Emperor Xian of Han (younger)
 Yin Shen / Su Ke as Liu Xie, Emperor Xian of Han (older)
 Xiao Lu / Ma Yusen / Wei Xian as Liu Ye
 Liang Zhenya as Liu Zhang
 Zhao Piyu as Lu Ji
 Cao Li / Song Banggui / Ma Yuliang as Lu Su
 Gao Fei as Lu Xun
 Yang Zhaoquan as Lu Zhi
 Cao Shixiang as Lü Boshe
 Zhang Guangbei as Lü Bu
 Liu Yan as Lü Bu's daughter
 Suo Eryong as Lü Fan
 Chu Guoliang / Guo Molang as Lü Meng
 An Yaping as Ma Chao
 Li Jianping / Chen Guanxin as Ma Dai
 Wang Xianhe / Li Ping as Ma Liang
 Zhang Zhizhong as Ma Su
 Huang Wenjun as Ma Teng
 Zhang Hao as Ma Zhong
 Qin Baolin as Ma Zun
 Zhou Huilin as Mao Jie
 Zhang Nan as Meng Da
 Hu Zhanli as Meng Huo
 Yan Fengqi as Meng Jian
 Li Yankui as Meng Jie
 Sude Siqin as Meng Tan
 Li Dongguo as Meng You
 Xu Di / Wang Luyao as Lady Mi
 Kui Heguo as Mi Fang
 Zhu Bingqian / Yang Naihuang / Ren Dongsheng as Mi Zhu
 Zhang Xuting as King Midang
 Pang Daxin as Pan Ying
 Hei Shuikuan / Sun Qicheng as Pan Zhang
 Zhang Yuanpeng as Pang De
 Jin Shugui / Zhu Shibin as Pang Tong
 Guo Jiaqing as Pujing
 Jiang Jin as Two Qiaos' father
 Wang Fengwen as Qiao Zhou
 Chen Changlong as Qin Liang
 Wang Zhongxin as Qin Mi
 Liu Liwei as Qin Qi
 Zhao Piyu as Qiu Jian
 Wang Ying as Shao Ti
 Wang Xian as Shen Pei
 Ma Shuliang as Shi Tao
 Ji Chonggong as Shi Xu
 Zheng Xu as Shi Zuan
 Su Min as Sima Hui
 Pan Yinlai as Sima Shi (younger)
 Lei Tieliu as Sima Shi (older)
 Lü Suosen as Sima Wang
 Han Qing as Sima Yan
 Tang Zhenhuan as Sima Yi (younger)
 Wei Zongwan as Sima Yi (older)
 Li Chiyou as Sima Zhao (younger)
 Gao Lancun as Sima Zhao (older)
 Xu Hongda as Su Yue
 Pu Cunxin as Sun Ce
 Yang Jun as Sun Li
 Guo Jiaqiang / Xia Junyin as Sun Qian
 Zhao Yue as Sun Shangxiang
 Pan Yueming as Sun Xiu
 Li Hongtao / Chen Zhihui as Taishi Ci
 Zhang Tong as Tao Qian
 Gao Baobao as Lady Tian
 Zhang Lianzhong as Tian Feng
 Wang Tiejun as Tian Si
 Chi Chonggen as Wang Fu
 Zhang Hongying as Wang Jing
 Dong Ji as Wang Lang
 Cui Dai as Wang Ping
 Yan Yansheng as Wang Su
 Zheng Dapeng as Wang Tao
 Xu Yun as Wang Youtong
 Tan Zongyao as Wang Yun
 Mo Qi as Wang Zhi
 Shi Changjin as Wang Zifu
 Liu Wei / Wang Xiaoying / Wang Shaowen / Wang Xinhai as Wei Yan
 Mang Lai / Bi Lige as Wen Ping
 Lin Moyu / Yu Ruojuan as Lady Wu
 Li Shicai as Wu Ban
 Liu Jianwei as Wu Fu
 Hong Zongxi as Wu Yayu
 Hong Ximai as Xi Zheng
 He Jing as Xiaoqiao
 Shi Tiansheng / Shen Shuangcun as Xiahou Ba
 Bala Zhu'er as Xiahou Dun
 Yang Lixin as Xiahou Jie
 Wang Jiming as Xiahou Mao
 Jiao Yucheng as Xiahou Shang
 Hao Yueguo as Xiahou Xuan
 Qian Yulin as Xiahou Yuan
 Ma Xingyue / Qin Baolin as Xin Pi
 Wang Jianguo / Lu Ying / Chen Zhihui / Han Dong as Xu Chu
 Huoercha / Nige Mutu / Li Dongguo / Liu Honglin / Xie Dong as Xu Huang
 Zhang Qin as Xu Jing
 Zhang Xiaoming as Xu Sheng
 Zhai Wanchen as Xu Shu
 Tai Renhui as Xu Shu's mother
 Shi Xiaoman as Xu You
 Wang Ying as Xue Zong
 Yu Jianai as Xun You
 Gu Lan as Xun Yu
 Gao Baobao as Lady Yan (Lü Bu's wife)
 Li Tan as Yan Jun
 Xie Jiaqi as Yan Liang
 Li Zhongbi / Wang Wenyou as Yan Yan
 Si Gengtian as Yang Feng
 Gao Xiaobao as Yang Ling
 Liu Jianwei as Yang Song
 Meng Xianli as Yang Yi
 Liu Longbin / Wang Hui as Yi Ji
 Chu Jianfu as Yu Fan
 Siqin Bilige / Qi Kejian as Yu Jin
 Zhou Wanhong as Yu Qiong
 Li Qingxiang as Yuan Shao (older)
 Chen Youwang / Wang Fusheng as Yuan Shu
 Deng Xiaoguang as Yuan Tan
 Shen Long as Yue Jin
 Ma Jingwu as Zhang Bao (Yellow Turban)
 Chi Guodong as Zhang Bao (Zhang Fei's son)
 Zhu Decang as Zhang Dang
 Wang Huanan / Xing Guozhou as Zhang He
 Tian Ye as Zhang Hu
 Yin Huasheng as Zhang Ji
 Yuan Zhiguang as Zhang Jiao
 You Shijun as Zhang Liang
 Xu Shaohua / Zhang Yakun / Wang Weiguo as Zhang Liao
 Ma Yuliang as Zhang Lu
 Xie Zhijian as Zhang Rang
 Zhou Zhonghe as Zhang Ren
 Zhang Ju as Zhang Song
 Wang Mianzhi as Zhang Wen
 Han Shanxu as Zhang Xiu
 Qi Wenqiang as Zhang Yi
 Zhou Jiwei as Zhang Zhao
 Zhang Shan as Zhao Yun (younger)
 Li Baohua as Zhao Fan
 Gai Ke as Zhao Fan's sister-in-law
 Han Xinmin as Zhao Lei
 Hou Yongsheng as Zhao Yun (older)
 Han Xinmin as Zheng Tai
 Guan Yue as Zhong Hui
 Liu Geng as Zhong Yao
 Liu Runcheng as Zhou Cang
 Yin Wei / Zhang Ying as Zhou Tai
 Li Yunjuan as Lady Zhurong
 Zhong Yujie / Wang Zhaogui as Zhuge Jin
 Shi Ni as Zhuge Jun
 He Bing as Zhuge Ke
 Su Chongshan as Zhuge Zhan

Music
The music for the series was composed by Gu Jianfen (谷建芬) and Li Yiding (李一丁).

See also
 List of media adaptations of Romance of the Three Kingdoms
 Three Kingdoms (TV series)

References

External links

Works based on Romance of the Three Kingdoms
1994 Chinese television series debuts
1994 Chinese television series endings
Television series set in the Three Kingdoms
Television series set in the Eastern Han dynasty
Mandarin-language television shows
Chinese historical television series